The Alliance for the Great Lakes is the largest and oldest citizens' environmental organization dedicated to the protection of North America's Great Lakes. Its mission is to conserve and restore the world's largest freshwater resources using policy, education and local efforts, to ensure the health of Great Lakes and clean water for future generations of people and wildlife. Throughout its history, the integration of both public engagement and sound policy has been the cornerstone of the Alliance for the Great Lakes' approach for the restoration and protection of Great Lakes.

Establishment
The proliferation of nuclear power plants around Lake Michigan and threats to Indiana' dunes led activists from the four-state region to convene at a conference on April 12, 1969, organized by Hyde Park Herald editor and Openlands Project staffer Lee Botts. The conferees' top recommendation was for the formation of an organization composed of professional staff, to coordinate research and public awareness about threats and policy solutions for the rehabilitation of the largest lake wholly within U.S. borders.

At a second conference a year later (May 2, 1970), the conference organizers announced the formation of the "Lake Michigan Federation", with its formal establishment announced in September. With support from the Chicago Community Trust, Wieboldt Foundation, and others, the group took on a board of directors from Illinois, Indiana, Michigan and Wisconsin, and professional staff, with Botts serving as first executive director. It immediately provided capacity for citizens to monitor compliance of pollution discharge permits, and worked to challenge the siting of new, and the expansion of existing, shoreline power plants.

In 1971, led by Botts, it successfully lobbied Mayor Richard J. Daley for Chicago to become the first Great Lakes city to ban phosphates in detergents. The visible effects of such phosphates led to the need for joint U.S.-Canadian efforts to reduce nutrients which caused excessive algae growth. These ecological conditions created an opening for the Federation to help press for both the first binational Great Lakes Water Quality Agreement and the U.S. Clean Water Act, in 1972.

In 1975, Botts left, in part due to a disagreement with the Board about the organization's mission.

In 1977, President Jimmy Carter appointed her to head the Great Lakes Basin Commission until 1980, when it was disbanded by the Reagan Administration. Over the years, Botts would return twice, however, as acting executive director in an effort to provide continuity to the organization.

In 2005 the organization adopted the new name of Alliance for the Great Lakes.

Leadership
The intervening years saw some contraction, until the appointment of Glenda Daniel as executive director in 1986. During her tenure, the Lake Michigan Federation opened offices in Muskegon, Milwaukee, and Green Bay, with its original headquarters remaining in Chicago. With the U.S. and Canada signing a major amendment to the U.S.-Canada Great Lakes Water Quality Agreement in 1987, which among other things allowed for the designation of toxic hotspot "Areas of Concern," the Federation made a significant push to empower local communities in these "AOCs" to seek support for the implementation of cleanups. After Daniel's resignation in 1992, again, the organization contracted, nearly shuttering.

In 1998, the Board of Directors appointed Cameron Davis to serve as its executive director. Having started as a volunteer under Botts' guidance in 1986 and rising to serve as deputy director before leaving to pursue a career in environmental litigation, Davis returned with an aggressive focus on advocacy and expanding partnerships in various states, including bipartisan outreach to federal, state, and municipal elected officials. In 2003, the Alliance formed the Adopt-a-Beach™ program, a platform for volunteers to monitor and restore coastlines around the Great Lakes. In 2005, with a unanimous vote of the Board of Directors, the organization changed its name to the "Alliance for the Great Lakes" and appointed Davis as its first President & CEO. In 2008, the Alliance received the American Bar Association's Distinguished Achievement Award in Environmental Law and Policy, the first not-for-profit citizen's group to win the award. In 2009, the newly elected President Barack Obama, who had once represented South Chicago's lakefront district as a state senator, appointed Davis to coordinate federal inter-departmental Great Lakes restoration work.

In December 2009, the Board selected Joel Brammeier, the Alliance's vice president for Policy, as President & CEO. In 2011, the Healing Our Waters-Great Lakes Coalition named Brammeier a co-chair of the 120-plus organization consortium, which among other efforts, campaigned for the establishment of the Great Lakes Restoration Initiative. Brammeier has been a leading advocate for re-separating the Chicago Area Waterway System to protect the Great Lakes from invasive species such as Asian carp.

Accomplishments
The Alliance's reach has extended to Washington, D.C., where in 1974, based on PCBs' devastating impact in the Great Lakes, the organization led efforts for Congress to ban the chemical through the Toxic Substances Control Act. In 1989, it initiated a lawsuit to prevent the illegal sale of Lake Michigan lake bottom by the Illinois legislature to a prominent Chicago university, despite disagreement about the move from other environmental organizations. Decades later, the case "Lake Michigan Federation v. U.S. Army Corps of Engineers" is a seminal decision under the Public Trust Doctrine, which prohibits the sale of public Great Lakes resources to private entities.

In 2002 and again in 2008, the Alliance helped write and partner with business interests to pass the Great Lakes Legacy Act to fund Area of Concern cleanups. It helped write and pass the Great Lakes Basin Water Resources Compact to set water conservation standards. The Compact was signed into law in 2008. And, with its traditional emphasis on encouraging citizens to get involved, the Alliance continued to build its Adopt-a-Beach program. In recent years the program has surpassed 10,000 volunteers annually and marked a new commitment to data-driven conservation, with volunteers using their own data to implement smoking bans at public beaches and inform decisions on "microplastics" from cosmetics that have the potential to harm ecosystem health.

References

Great Lakes
Great Lakes region (U.S.)
Nature conservation organizations based in the United States
Water organizations in the United States
Environmental organizations based in Chicago
Environmental organizations established in 1970